Buena Vista is an unincorporated community within Buena Vista Charter Township, Saginaw County in the U.S. state of Michigan. The U.S. Census Bureau has defined a census-designated place (CDP) with the same name for statistical purposes. The CDP has no official status as a municipality and the boundaries defined by the Census Bureau may not precisely correspond to local understanding of the Buena Vista area. The CDP consists of an area adjacent to the city of Saginaw on its east side and mostly east of Interstate 75. The population was 7,845 at the 2000 census.

History
Buena Vista began in 1846 when Curtis Emerson bought an abandoned mill here and created a settlement around it.  It was named to commemorate Zachary Taylor's then recent victory at the Battle of Buena Vista.

On July 30, 2013, the Saginaw Intermediate School District Board of Trustees officially dissolved the Buena Vista School District with the district area being split up between three other districts.

Geography

Demographics

As of the census of 2000, there were 7,845 people, 2,905 households, and 2,077 families residing in the CDP. The racial makeup of the CDP was 22.51% White, 69.27% African American, 0.45% Native American, 0.17% Asian, 0.01% Pacific Islander, 4.91% from other races, and 2.69% from two or more races. Hispanic or Latino of any race were 9.82% of the population.

There were 2,905 households, out of which 35.8% had children under the age of 18 living with them, 35.5% were married couples living together, 31.4% had a female householder with no husband present, and 28.5% were non-families. 24.1% of all households were made up of individuals, and 8.8% had someone living alone who was 65 years of age or older.  The average household size was 2.65 and the average family size was 3.13.

In the CDP, the population was spread out, with 30.8% under the age of 18, 8.8% from 18 to 24, 26.2% from 25 to 44, 21.9% from 45 to 64, and 12.3% who were 65 years of age or older.  The median age was 33 years. For every 100 females, there were 88.0 males.  For every 100 females age 18 and over, there were 80.4 males.

The median income for a household in the CDP was $26,689, and the median income for a family was $30,118. Males had a median income of $29,000 versus $23,866 for females. The per capita income for the CDP was $14,243.  About 22.4% of families and 22.9% of the population were below the poverty line, including 33.7% of those under age 18 and 13.8% of those age 65 or over.

Education
The CDP is mostly within the Saginaw City School District. Portions south of Hess Avenue are within the Bridgeport-Spaulding Community School District.

References

Unincorporated communities in Saginaw County, Michigan
Census-designated places in Michigan
Populated places established in 1846
Unincorporated communities in Michigan
Census-designated places in Saginaw County, Michigan
1846 establishments in Michigan